The Central Provident Fund Board (CPFB), commonly known as the CPF Board or simply the Central Provident Fund (CPF), is a compulsory comprehensive savings and pension plan for working Singaporeans and permanent residents primarily to fund their retirement, healthcare, education and housing needs in Singapore. 

The CPF is an employment-based savings scheme with the help of employers and employees contributing a mandated amount to the fund for their benefits.

It is administered by the Central Provident Fund Board, a statutory board operating under the Ministry of Manpower which is responsible for investing contributions. The Global Pension Index, an index that assesses retirement income systems, placed Singapore as the best within in Asia and 7th worldwide in 2020.

CPF monies are used by the CPF Board to invest in the exclusive purchase of Government-issued Special Singapore Government Securities (SSGS), with the proceeds from these transactions going into the past reserves.

As at 2020, the CPF managed US$397 billion (S$540 billion) for 4.1 million account holders.

History

British colonial authorities in Singapore, proposed by David Marshall via the Progressive Party committee, created the Central Provident Fund in 1955 as a compulsory savings scheme to assist workers to provide for their retirement without needing to introduce a more extensive and costly old age pension. Money contributed to the Central Provident Fund earned a nominal rate of return. The Central Provident Fund was expanded in 1968 to provide for housing expenses under the Public Housing Scheme. In 1984 the Central Provident Fund was again expanded to cover medical care expenses. In 1986 an investment option was added to give members the opportunity to manage their own risk and returns.

In 1987, the Minimum Retirement Sum Scheme annuity was introduced. In 1990, MediShield health insurance funded by Central Provident Fund savings, was launched to provide universal healthcare to all Singaporeans. Later programs includes interest rate top up of 1% for the first $60,000 of retirement savings, the Workfare Income Supplement which supplements retirement savings for low-income older workers, and the Pioneer Generation Package which provides additional support for the medical expenses of older workers.

When the CPF was started in 1955, both employees and employers contributed 5% of an employee's pay to the scheme. The rate of contribution was progressively increased to 25% for both employers and employees in 1985. The employer contribution was cut to 10% during a recession in 1986. The employer contribution rate was reverted to match the employee rate until the 1997–1998 Asian Financial Crisis, and thereafter lowered to 10% for workers 55 years or younger. Since then, the employer contribution rate has been gradually increased. Employers currently contribute 3 fewer percentage points of salaries over S$750 for employees up to 55 years old.

Overview

Accounts and interest rates
Employees and employers are required to make monthly contributions to the following CPF accounts:
 Ordinary Account (OA) – for housing, pay for CPF insurance, investment and education.
 Special Account (SA) – for old age and investment in retirement-related financial products.
 Medisave Account (MA) – for hospitalisation and approved medical insurance.

The OA and SA is combined to form the Retirement Account (RA) when one turns 55. The RA is used to meet basic needs during old age.

The CPF savings earn a minimum interest of 2.5% for OA and 4% for other accounts. In addition, the first $60,000 in the combined CPF balances, with up to $20,000 from the Ordinary Account, will earn an extra 1% interest.

CPF contribution rates
As of 2018, the employer's CPF contribution is 17% for those up to age of 55 and decreases to 7.5% for those 65 and above. The employee's CPF contribution is 20% up to age 55, above 55 to 60 years of age 13%, above 60 to 65 to 7.5%, and decreases to 5% for those 65 and above.

Retirement Schemes

CPF Minimum Sum
The CPF Minimum Sum (MS) Scheme requires all members to set aside a minimum sum of CPF savings in the RA for retirement needs upon reaching 55 years old. CPF savings from the OA and SA would be transferred to the RA for this purpose. Members whose savings are in excess of the MS and Medisave minimum sum would be allowed to withdraw them in cash. For members with insufficient savings in the RA, their property bought with their CPF savings will be automatically pledged to make up up to half of their MS. Members would receive a monthly stipend from their RA at the start of their draw down age until it is depleted.

The MS has been continuously increased over the years to account for inflation and longer life expectancies. CPF members who turn 55 between 1 July 2014 and 30 June 2015 will need to set aside a Minimum Sum of $155,000 in their Retirement Account and $40,500 in their Medisave Account. Over the years, the draw down age has been progressively delayed from 60 to 65. For the cohort who reached age 55 in 2016, only 53% of those who are active members met the Minimum Sum requirement, leaving 47% failing to do so.

CPF Life
Members with at least $40,000 in their Retirement Account at 55 or at least $60,000 at 65 years old will be asked to select a CPF LIFE annuity plan, which will give them an income for life, starting from their draw down age. Those who are not on CPF LIFE can choose to join it or continue to keep the monies in their Retirement Account.

It improves upon the Minimum Sum Scheme where payouts only last about 20 years. No minimum amount of RA savings will be needed to join CPF LIFE, however the monthly payout depends on the RA savings. Thus, members with lower RA balances will receive correspondingly lower monthly payouts.

Members who have a life annuity from an insurance company that provides equivalent benefits to that of CPF LIFE may be exempted from joining the scheme.

Medical Schemes

Medisave
Medisave may be used to cover self or dependents' hospitalisation expenses. It may also be used for certain outpatient treatments like chemotherapy and radiotherapy treatments.

The Basic Healthcare Sum (BHS) is the maximum amount a citizen member can have in their MediSave account and is the estimated savings they need in their MediSave Account for their basic subsidised healthcare needs in old age. Part of citizen members' working contributions will be allocated to their MA until their balance reaches the Basic Healthcare Sum (BHS). Amounts above the BHS will be transferred to citizen members' other CPF accounts, depending on their age.

Since 1 January 2004, CPF members who turn 55 and are able to meet the CPF Minimum Sum are required to set aside the Medisave Minimum Sum (MMS) in their MA when they make a CPF withdrawal. The MMS is set at $40,500 from 1 July 2013. OA and/or SA balances in excess of the Minimum Sum will be used to top up the MMS if it is insufficient.

Medishield Life
MediShield Life is a catastrophic care scheme to help citizens and their dependents to meet the high medical costs of prolonged or serious illnesses. Medisave savings may be used to cover the premiums for MediShield Life.

Medifund

Created in April 1993, Medifund helps the poor and needy to cover their medical bills. It acts only as a backup scheme when CPF members have depleted their other health savings accounts. Medifund has a list of approved institutions and requires a comprehensive amount of documentation for applicants.

Protection Schemes

Eldershield
ElderShield is a severe disability insurance scheme that provides monthly cash payout of $300 or $400 up to a maximum period of 5 or 6 years. CPF members with a Medisave account will be automatically enrolled into the scheme once they reach 40 years old unless they opt-out. In order to make a claim under this scheme, a person must lose the ability to perform at least three out of the six daily activities: Washing, Dressing, Feeding, Toileting, Mobility, Transferring.

As of 2018, depending on the payout, entry age and gender, the annual premium for Eldershield ranges from $152 to $3132. This premium is non-guaranteed and may be adjusted in the future.

According to Minister for Health Gan Kim Yong, about $2.6 billion have been collected in premiums for ElderShield, out of which around $100 million have been paid out in claims and $130 million in premium rebates from its inception in 2002 to end 2015. According to Gan Kim Yong, ElderShield collects premiums while the policyholder is aged 40 to 65, and provides lifetime coverage from age 40, even after the policyholder reaches 65 and stops paying premiums. The total amount of premiums collected exceed the amount of claims paid to-date because the premiums collected are meant to provide coverage against future claims throughout policyholders' lifetime.

Careshield Life
On 25 May 2018, the Ministry of Health announced that it will be introducing a mandatory insurance scheme that will enhance the existing Eldershield by 2020 for those aged between 30 and 40. Similar to Eldershield, to claim under Careshield Life, one has to lose the ability to perform at least three out of six daily living activities. Careshield Life premium has a longer payment period of 38 years (variable depending on re-employment age cap) compared to 26 years for Eldershield and there is no way to opt out unlike Eldershield. The annual premium is also higher, starting at $200 for men joining at the age of 30 and $250 for women, with premium rising at 2% per annum initially. The monthly payout starts at $600 per month and last through a lifetime.

Dependents' Protection Scheme
The Dependents' Protection Scheme provides a maximum coverage of $46,000 for families to tide over the first few years in the event of an insured member's terminal illness, total permanent disability or death up to 60 years old. The annual premium increases with age, from $36 at 21 years old to $260 at 55 years old.

Housing Schemes
The Ordinary Account savings can be used to purchase a home under the CPF housing schemes. A Housing and Development Board (HDB) flat may be purchased under the Public Housing Scheme, or a private property under the Residential Properties Scheme. CPF savings may be used for full or partial payment of the property, and to service the monthly housing payments. Home buyers who are taking a bank loan to finance their property purchase have to pay the first 5% of the down payment in cash. If a flat is purchased under the Public Housing Scheme, mortgage insurance under the Home Protection Scheme will be necessary.

Investment Scheme
CPF members may invest their Ordinary Account balance under the CPF Investment Scheme – Ordinary Account (CPFIS-OA) and their Special Account balance under the CPF Investment Scheme – Special Account (CPFIS-SA), subject to caps. Assets that may be invested includes Insurance, unit trusts, Exchange Traded Funds (ETFs), Fixed Deposits, Bonds and Treasury Bills, Shares, Property Fund and Gold. From 1 July 2010, only monies in excess of $20,000 in the Ordinary Account and $40,000 in the Special Account can be invested.

CPF Withdrawal
From 2003 to 2013, CPF members who left Singapore withdrew SGD$426 million, or 0.3 per cent of the average total members' balances each year.

From 2013 to 2017, an annual average of 13,500 CPF members, or 0.4% of total CPF members, withdrew their CPF monies when they left Singapore.

Conditions for withdrawal
CPF savings can be withdrawn on the following grounds:
 Malaysians who are at least 50 years old and residing in West Malaysia.
 Anyone who has renounced his citizenship or PR and leaving Singapore and West Malaysia permanently.
 Upon death.
 Conditional partial withdrawal for those who are certified permanently unfit for work, such as physically or mentally incapacitated.

Controversies

Comparison with City Harvest Church Fund
On 15 May 2014, Roy Ngerng made a post entitled "Where Your CPF Money Is Going: Learning From The City Harvest Trial" on his blog the Heart Truths. Within the post, Ngerng created a chart which mapped the relationships between the Prime Minister of Singapore, Lee Hsien Loong, the Central Provident Fund (CPF), the Monetary Authority of Singapore (MAS), Temasek Holdings and the Government of Singapore Investment Corporation (GIC). Ngerng claimed there was an "uncanny resemblance" between this chart and another chart by news agency Channel News Asia regarding the relationship among City Harvest Church leaders, who were being charged with misappropriating funds.

The CPF has been described as "a forced savings scheme" for Singaporeans with "monthly contributions into the fund" to be saved for retirement, or for expenses on "property, healthcare, and their children's education", while the GIC has been described to have "indirectly invested" funds from the CPF. Singapore's Ministry of Finance on its part has put forth its explanation as to why CPF funds are invested in Special Singapore Government Securities, to enable CPF Board to be able to pay its members all their monies when due, and the interest that it commits to pay on CPF accounts. The government securities are invested as part of a combined pool of funds managed by GIC, rather than managed in a separate dedicated fund, as a standalone fund would have to be managed conservatively to avoid the risk of failing to meet obligations to CPF members.

On 18 May, Prime Minister (PM) Lee responded through his lawyer Davinder Singh, who stated that the blog post alleged that Lee "is guilty of criminal misappropriation of the monies paid by Singaporeans to the CPF" and that the allegations were "false and baseless".

Ngerng said that the article was a call for greater transparency on the CPF, the GIC and Temasek Holdings. and called for PM Lee to rebut the points made in his blog post. Singapore's Ministry of Finance has publicly stated that CPF monies are safe as all CPF monies are invested in securities that are issued and guaranteed by the Singapore Government, which is one of the few remaining triple-A credit-rated governments in the world.

Ngerng apologized "unreservedly" on 23 May, admitting that his allegation was "false and completely without foundation".

On 29 May 2014, Prime Minister Lee filed a defamation lawsuit against Ngerng. In a 4 August affidavit, Ngerng argued that his blog post had been misunderstood, and that he was merely asking for more transparency and accountability for CPF monies.

On 7 November 2014, the High Court of Singapore found Ngerng liable of defamation with damages to be assessed, which was the first such ruling in Singapore over a purely online article. Judge Lee Seiu Kin ruled that there was "no triable defence" and "no doubt that it is defamatory to suggest that the plaintiff is guilty of criminal misappropriation". An injunction against Ngerng was granted, barring him from publishing future similar accusations regarding PM Lee and the CPF. Ngerng expressed disappointment at the verdict, but maintained that he would "still continue to speak up on the CPF and other issues that concern Singaporeans".

On 17 December 2015 the court led by Lee Seiu Kin handed down a judgement ordering Ngerng to pay S$100,000 in general damages and S$50,000 in aggravated damages. Ngerng, through his lawyer, Eugene Thuraisingam proposed to pay the S$150,000 in instalments which was granted by the Prime Minister on the condition that Ngerng paid the S$30,000 in hearing costs immediately i.e. by 16 March 2016. Ngerng is expected to repay $100 a month from 1 April 2016 onwards over five years until 1 April 2021 when instalments are increased to S$1,000 until the full sum has been paid by the year 2033. Lee also rejected Ngerng's request to reimburse part of the damages i.e. S$36,000.

See also 
 Central Provident Fund (South Africa)
 Social security
 Employees Provident Fund, Malaysia's Provident Fund
 Economy of Singapore
 Provident fund (disambiguation)

Similar systems elsewhere
National Insurance (UK)
Social Security in France
South African Social Security Agency
Social Security (United States)
Social security in Sweden
Social security in Australia
Canada Pension Plan
Mandatory Provident Fund (Hong Kong)

References

External links

Singapore’s Central Provident Fund Scheme An Overview and A Comparison with the U.S. Social Security System 

1955 establishments in Singapore
Government agencies established in 1955
Statutory boards of the Singapore Government
1955 establishments in Malaya
Singapore government policies